In Australian rules football, the followers are the players in the three positions- ruckman, ruck rover, and rover. These three players are known as followers because they have traditionally been used as players that follow the ball all around the ground, as opposed to playing in a set position. In recent years, there has been a decreased emphasis on set positions in Australian football. Followers still cover more ground than any other player on the field.

Ruckman
The ruckman's job is to contest with the opposing ruckman at centre-bounces that take place at the start of each quarter or after each goal, and at stoppages (i.e., boundary throw ins, ball ups). The ruckman usually uses his height (typically players are over 195 cm tall) to palm/tap the ball down so that a ruck rover or rover can run onto it.

Notable ruckmen in Australian football over the years include:
 John Nicholls (1957-1974), Named back pocket in AFL Team of the Century (1996)
 Jack Dyer
 Roy Wright Brownlow Medallist 1952, 1954
 John "Sam" Newman (Geelong, 1964-1980)
 Don Scott (1967-1981)
 Simon Madden (1974-1992), Norm Smith Medallist 1985
 Peter Moore ( and Melbourne, 1974-1987), Brownlow Medallist 1979, 1984
 Paul Salmon
 Jim Stynes (Melbourne, 1987-1998), Brownlow Medallist 1991
 Scott Wynd (1988-2000), Brownlow Medallist 1992
 Peter Everitt
 Dean Cox
 Shaun Rehn (and Hawthorn, 1990-2002)
 Matthew Primus
 Jeff White
 Corey McKernan
 Aaron Sandilands
 Todd Goldstein
 Max Gawn

Ruck rover
Before the 1950s, the role of the ruck-rover was known as the follower. His role was to assist the ruckman and rover at centre bounces by blocking and shepherding them from opposition players. This position disappeared in the 1950s with the success of Ron Barassi, Jr. in a role designated for him by Melbourne coach Norm Smith. The closest equivalent of the follower position in today's game is known as a tagger.

The ruck rover's job is to be directly beneath the flight of the ball when a ruckman taps the ball down, allowing an easy take away, or clearance, from a stoppage. Typically players are not as tall as the ruckman, typically ranging from 170–190 cm in height.

Notable followers and ruck-rovers in Australian football over the years include:
 Paul Bagshaw (1964-1980), 
 Michael Tuck (1972-1991), former AFL career games record holder (426)
 Robert Harvey
 Chris Judd
 Jobe Watson
 Daniel Kerr
 Garry Hocking (1987-2001)
 Michael McGuane ( and Carlton, 1987-1997)
 Brad Sewell
 Trent Cotchin

Rover
The rover is a player who lurks around centre bounces and stoppages to receive the ball from a ruck rover and complete a clearance. Rovers are typically the smallest player on the ground.

Notable rovers in Australian football over the years include:
 Harry Collier (1926-1940), Brownlow Medallist 1930
 Allan Ruthven (Fitzroy, 1940-1954) Brownlow Medallist 1950
 Lou Richards (Collingwood, 1941-1955)
 Bill Hutchison (1942-1957), Brownlow Medallist 1952, 1953
 Bob Skilton (1956-1971), Brownlow Medallist 1959, 1963, 1968; Named rover in AFL Team of the Century (1996) 
 Bill Goggin (1958-1971) 
 Ross G. Smith (1961-1975), Brownlow medallist 1967
 Bill Walker (1961-1976), Sandover Medallist 1965, 1966, 1967, 1970 
 Kevin Bartlett (1965-1983)
 Peter Crimmins (1966-1971)
 Leigh Matthews (Hawthorn, 1969-1985), Named forward pocket in AFL Team of the Century (1996)
 Tony Liberatore (1986-2002), Brownlow Medallist 1990 
 John Platten (Hawthorn, 1986-1997), Magarey Medallist 1984, Brownlow Medallist 1987

References

Bibliography

See also
Football (Australian rules) positions

Australian rules football terminology